Parahyponomeuta is a genus of moths of the family Yponomeutidae.

Species
Parahyponomeuta bakeri (Walsingham, 1894) (from Madeira)
Parahyponomeuta egregiella (Duponchel, 1839) (palearctic)
Parahyponomeuta malgassaella  Viette, 1955 (from Madagascar)

References

Toll, S.Gr.v., 1941, Die Genitalien der europäischen Hyponomeuta. -  Zeitschrift des Wiener Entomologen-vereines (26): 170-176, Pl. XVII-XX.
De Prins, J. & De Prins, W. 2015. Afromoths, online database of Afrotropical moth species (Lepidoptera). World Wide Web electronic publication (www.afromoths.net) (acc.23-Nov-2015)

External links
lepiforum.de

Yponomeutidae